Aadharshila (English: The Foundation Stone) is a 1982 Hindi film written, produced and directed by Ashok Ahuja,  starring Naseeruddin Shah and Anita Kanwar.

The film won the Filmfare Critics Award for Best Movie and the Indira Gandhi Award for Best Debut Film of a Director.

Synopsis
The film is about Ajay (Naseeruddin Shah), a young filmmaker, hoping to direct his first film. He has just got married, and he shares his hopes with his wife Asha (Anita Kanwar). Asha works as a teacher to support them, while Ajay takes on other work, but is always hoping to make his film. Aadharshila portrays the struggles of young people - especially graduates of the Film and Television Institute of India - to find a foothold in the Indian film industry. The film ends with the completion of the film-within-a-film.

Soundtrack
 "Mehka Hua Gulab Ho Tum" - Dilraj Kaur, Suresh Wadkar
 "Sapnon Ka Sheher Hai Ye" -Bhupinder Singh
 "Sabse Bada Hai Kyo" - Aziz Nazan, Mahendra Kapoor
 "Yeh Jag Jhootha" - Anuradha Paudwal
 "Sarka Le Khatiya Naa Baba" - Krishna Kalle, Bhushan Mehta

Cast
The film has an ensemble cast - almost a who's who of the parallel cinema in India. Except for Naseeruddin Shah, for most of the others, it was their first film, even though other films may have been released earlier.
 Naseeruddin Shah
 Anita Kanwar
 Devki Nandan Pandey
 K. K. Raina
 Neena Gupta
 Pankaj Kapur
 Raghubir Yadav
 Annu Kapoor

Crew
 Directed by—Ashok Ahuja
 Written by—Ashok Ahuja
 Produced by—Ashok Ahuja
 Music -- Uttam Singh
 Cinematography—Sharad Navel 
 Editing -- Renu Saluja

Awards
 Filmfare Critics Award for Best Movie
 Indira Gandhi Award for Best Debut Film of a Director
 Film Ducat, International Filmfestival Mannheim-Heidelberg

Film Festivals
 International Film Festival of India, CALCUTTA 1982
 National Film Festival, NEW DELHI, 1982
 TASHKENT International Film Festival, 1982
 MANNHEIM International Filmwoche, 1982 
 HONGKONG International Film Festival, 1983 
 MOSCOW International Film Festival, 1983
 PIA Film Festival, TOKYO, 1983

References

External links
Director Ashok Ahuja's website
Official website

1982 films
Films scored by Uttam Singh
1980s Hindi-language films
Films about film directors and producers
Best Debut Feature Film of a Director National Film Award winners
1982 directorial debut films